= Insider Dealing (board game) =

Board game

Insider Dealing is a board game published in 1988 by Fantasy Games Ltd.

== Contents ==
Insider Dealing is a game in which players roll a die and can then buy or sell shares of stock based on whatever space they land on.

== Reception ==
Brian Walker reviewed Insider Dealing for Games International magazine, and gave it 1 1/2 stars out of 5, and stated that "The components are good quality and even include a calculator. But surely the cost of such an accessory would have been better spent on employing somebody capable of providing the game with a system other than rolling the die and hoping for the best?"
